Guillermo Gustavo Ahrens Valdivia (died 25 July 2017) was a Peruvian basketball player. He competed in the men's tournament at the 1948 Summer Olympics.

References

External links

Year of birth missing
2017 deaths
Peruvian men's basketball players
Olympic basketball players of Peru
Basketball players at the 1948 Summer Olympics
Place of birth missing
20th-century Peruvian people